Hiroyuki Kitahara (北原広之, born 13 September 1971) is a Japanese dressage rider. He represented Japan at the 2010 World Equestrian Games and won team silver at the 2002 Asian Games in Busan. In 2019 he set a new record by winning a CDI in Europe as first Japanese dressage rider.

Hiroyuki started riding at the age of eight at the Japan Racing Association's club in Tokyo, while joining the Japanese youth team. In his riding career he worked several times in Germany from 1999 till 2001 and from 2007 till 2008. In 2018 he returned to Germany to prepare for the 2020 Olympic Games to train with Finnish team rider Henri Ruoste.

Kitahara was part of the Japanese dressage team during the 2020 Summer Olympics in his city of birth Tokyo. He competed with his horse Huracan in the Grand Prix and finished 45th in the individual competition.

References

1971 births
Living people
Japanese equestrians
Japanese dressage riders
Asian Games silver medalists for Japan
Asian Games medalists in equestrian
Equestrians at the 2002 Asian Games
Medalists at the 2002 Asian Games
Equestrians at the 2020 Summer Olympics
Olympic equestrians of Japan